Argélico Fuchs (born Argélico Fucks; 4 September 1974) is a Brazilian professional football coach and former player. He is the current head coach of Chapecoense.

Fuchs' professional career as a central defender spanned 15 years, during which he was mainly associated with Benfica and Internacional. He also played in Japan, Spain and China, and appeared in one international match for Brazil. He started working as a coach in 2008, going on to be in charge of more than 20 clubs.

Playing career

Club
Known simply as Argel as a player, he was born in Santa Rosa, Rio Grande do Sul. He began his career with Internacional, Santos and Palmeiras, with a brief stint in Japan in between and an unsuccessful spell at Portugal's Porto, which finished after a serious run-in with the board of directors and prompted his Brazil return.

In early June 2001, Argel returned to Portugal with Benfica, which he helped win the Primeira Liga in his fourth season and the domestic supercup, the former after an 11-year drought. The player contributed to this feat with ten matches and one goal.

After falling down the pecking order at Benfica, Argel had a six-month stay at Racing de Santander, going on to retire in 2007 after representing Cruzeiro, Canoas and Chinese club Zhejiang Lucheng.

International
Argel represented Brazil at under-20 level, winning both the South American Youth Championship and the FIFA U-20 World Cup. On 29 March 1995 he earned his only cap for the full side, appearing in a friendly against Honduras.

Coaching career

Argel's coaching career began when he was hired as Guaratinguetá's head coach on 8 February 2008, being sacked exactly one year later. Three days later, he was hired by Caxias.

On 2 June 2009, Argel was hired by Campinense in the same capacity, replacing Fernando Teixeira. On 9 April of the following year, he signed for Criciúma.

Argel was announced as coach of former club Internacional on 13 August 2015, after leaving Figueirense which he had already managed on two separate spells. He was fired on 11 July after six games without a win, but hours later he returned to Figueirense.

On 13 September 2016, Argel was named head coach of Vitória. The following 1 May, after elimination from the Copa do Nordeste against Bahia and the massive brawl that ensued, he was sacked. This was his tenth dismissal in the decade – three alone in 2011 – while he had also resigned from seven jobs; only at Figueirense did he complete a full year in charge of a team.

After rejoining Criciúma, Argel was dismissed in May 2018. In September, he was announced as the new head coach of fellow Série B team Coritiba, being relieved of his duties on 16 February 2019 after being knocked out of the Copa do Brasil.

On 2 July 2019, Argel replaced Marcelo Cabo at the helm of first division newcomers CSA. On 28 November, he took over fellow top-tier side Ceará in the place of fired Adílson Batista, but was dismissed the following 9 February.

Argel returned to CSA on 31 August 2020, but was fired after only 18 days in charge. In October 2021, following a second spell at Botafogo de Ribeirão Preto, he returned to Portugal 17 years after leaving to take charge of third-division club Alverca.

On 19 March 2023, Fuchs returned to Brazil after being named in charge of Chapecoense in the second tier.

Surname
Some of Argel's fame stemmed from his prior surname, which coincided with a form of the English word "fuck". This led to some double entendre headlines, including one from Eurosport.com titled "Fucks off to Benfica"; this headline received press coverage itself with The Register calling it "snappy and eye-catching", and football humour site Laugh FC deeming it "one of the all time greats".

In 2020, the spelling was changed to "Fuchs", and Argel explained that the previous spelling was the result of an error by the registry, and that his name was always supposed to have been Fuchs.

Career statistics

Club

International

Honours

Club
Internacional
Campeonato Gaúcho: 1992, 1994
Copa do Brasil: 1992

Santos
Copa CONMEBOL: 1998

Porto
Taça de Portugal: 1999–2000
Supertaça Cândido de Oliveira: 2000

Palmeiras
Torneio Rio-São Paulo: 2000
Copa dos Campeões: 2000

Benfica
Primeira Liga: 2004–05
Taça de Portugal: 2003–04
Supertaça Cândido de Oliveira runner-up: 2004

International
Brazil U-17
South American Under-17 Football Championship: 1991

Brazil U-20
FIFA World Youth Championship: 1993
South American Youth Football Championship: 1992

References

External links

1974 births
Living people
People from Santa Rosa, Rio Grande do Sul
Brazilian people of German descent
Sportspeople from Rio Grande do Sul
Brazilian footballers
Association football defenders
Campeonato Brasileiro Série A players
Sport Club Internacional players
Santos FC players
Sociedade Esportiva Palmeiras players
Cruzeiro Esporte Clube players
J1 League players
Tokyo Verdy players
Primeira Liga players
FC Porto players
S.L. Benfica footballers
La Liga players
Racing de Santander players
Chinese Super League players
Zhejiang Professional F.C. players
Brazil under-20 international footballers
Brazil international footballers
Brazilian expatriate footballers
Expatriate footballers in Japan
Expatriate footballers in Portugal
Expatriate footballers in Spain
Expatriate footballers in China
Brazilian expatriate sportspeople in Japan
Brazilian expatriate sportspeople in Portugal
Brazilian expatriate sportspeople in Spain
Brazilian expatriate sportspeople in China
Brazilian football managers
Campeonato Brasileiro Série A managers
Campeonato Brasileiro Série B managers
Campeonato Brasileiro Série C managers
Mogi Mirim Esporte Clube managers
Sociedade Esportiva e Recreativa Caxias do Sul managers
Guaratinguetá Futebol managers
Campinense Clube managers
Esporte Clube São José managers
Criciúma Esporte Clube managers
Guarani FC managers
Botafogo Futebol Clube (SP) managers
Brasiliense Futebol Clube managers
Oeste Futebol Clube managers
Joinville Esporte Clube managers
Figueirense FC managers
Avaí FC managers
Red Bull Brasil managers
América Futebol Clube (RN) managers
Associação Portuguesa de Desportos managers
Sport Club Internacional managers
Esporte Clube Vitória managers
Goiás Esporte Clube managers
Coritiba Foot Ball Club managers
Centro Sportivo Alagoano managers
Ceará Sporting Club managers
Associação Chapecoense de Futebol managers
Brazilian expatriate football managers
Expatriate football managers in Portugal